Stigmella flavipedella is a moth of the family Nepticulidae. It is found in Ohio and Kentucky in the United States.

The wingspan is 3.6–5 mm. Adults are on wing in March, May and early June, and mid-July and August. Larvae have been collected in June and late July and in late August and September. There are three generations per year.

The larvae feed on Quercus species, including Q. platanoides, Q. palustris, Q. rubra and Q. imbricaria. They mine the leaves of their host plant. The mine starts as an upper-surface, very narrow linear gallery which abruptly enlarges and becomes transparent, then broadens gradually and becomes much contorted in later stages. The frass is deposited as a diffuse central line in early stages, but across the entire width of the mine in the later portion.

External links
Nepticulidae of North America
A taxonomic revision of the North American species of Stigmella (Lepidoptera: Nepticulidae)

Nepticulidae
Moths of North America
Moths described in 1914